The North Star Conference or NSC was a women's conference in the NCAA. The conference existed from the 1983–84 school year through the 1991–92 school year. Originally announced in 1983, the conference was formed by charter members Butler, Dayton, DePaul, Detroit, Evansville, Loyola (Chicago), Notre Dame, and Xavier.  Although the conference was to offer competition in cross country, softball, swimming, tennis, and volleyball, the conference was created primarily as a basketball conference.  With the exception of Butler and Dayton, all charter members' women's basketball teams were already competing at the NCAA Division I level; Butler and Dayton upgraded their teams from NCAA Division II and commenced competition in the conference's second season.  The conference was effectively absorbed by the Mid-Continent Conference (now known as The Summit League), as six of its final seven members moved their women's sports to that organization (the remaining member, Akron, moved all its sports for both sexes to the Mid-American Conference).

Membership
Akron 1988-1989 through 1991-1992
Butler 1984-1985 through 1985-1986
Cleveland State 1988-1989 through 1991-1992
Dayton 1984-1985 through 1987-1988
DePaul 1983-1984 through 1990-1991
Detroit 1983-1984 through 1985-1986
Evansville 1983-1984 through 1985-1986
Illinois-Chicago 1988-1989 through 1991-1992
Loyola (Illinois) 1983-1984 through 1985-1986
Marquette 1986-1987 through 1988-1989
Northern Illinois 1987-1988 through 1991-1992
Notre Dame 1983-1984 through 1987-1988
Valparaiso 1987-1988 through 1991-1992
Wisconsin-Green Bay 1988-1989 through 1991-1992
Wright State 1990-1991 through 1991-1992
Xavier 1983-1984 through 1985-1986

Membership timeline

Commissioner
Jean Ponsetto 1987–1989

Women's Basketball

Conference Champions

Regular season

Conference Tournament

Honors

Coach of the Year
1983-84 
1984-85 Mary DiStanislao, Notre Dame
1985-86 Mary DiStanislao, Notre Dame
1986-87 
1987-88 Muffet McGraw, Notre Dame
1988-89 Jane Albright-Dieterle, Northern Illinois
1989-90 Jane Albright-Dieterle, Northern Illinois
1990-91 
1991-92

Player of the Year
1983-84 
1984-85 
1985-86 Trena Keys, Notre Dame
1986-87 Trena Keys, Notre Dame
1987-88 
1988-89 
1989-90 Carol Owens, Northern Illinois
1990-91 Lisa Foss, Northern Illinois 
1991-92

Attendance

Women's Volleyball

Conference Champions

Regular season
Season Number of Teams School
1983 6 
1984 8 
1985 8
1986 4
1987 6
1988 8 Northern Illinois
1989 7 
1990 8 
1991 7

Conference Tournament

References

External links
https://web.archive.org/web/20080510134324/http://www2.ncaa.org/portal/media_and_events/ncaa_publications/records_books/winter/basketball/index.html

 
Sports in the Midwestern United States
Defunct NCAA Division I conferences
Summit League
1983 establishments in the United States
1992 disestablishments in the United States
Sports leagues established in 1983
Sports leagues disestablished in 1992